Gudrun Hausch (born 23 August 1969) is a German former judoka. She competed in the women's lightweight event at the 1992 Summer Olympics.

References

External links
 

1969 births
Living people
German female judoka
Olympic judoka of Germany
Judoka at the 1992 Summer Olympics
Sportspeople from Tübingen